Spiniger is a genus of fungi in the family Bondarzewiaceae. The widespread genus contains two species.

References

External links

Russulales
Russulales genera